The 2013 Interprovincial Twenty20 Cup was the first season of the Interprovincial Twenty20 Cup, the domestic Twenty20 cricket competition of Ireland. The competition was played between Leinster Lightning, Northern Knights, and North West Warriors.

The competition was won by Leinster Lightning, who won the last game of the competition, against North West Warriors at Bready CC, to draw level with Northern Knights on 6 points, but finish top of the table on Net Run Rate.

The Interprovincial Series has been funded at least partly by the ICC via their TAPP programme.

Table

Squads

Fixtures

Records

Highest Individual Innings

Best Bowling in an Innings

Season Aggregates

Most runs

Most wickets

See also
2013 Interprovincial Championship
2013 Interprovincial One-Day Trophy

References

Inter
Inter-Provincial Trophy seasons